Centre Island is a small island in Lake Te Anau in the Southland Region of New Zealand.  About 600 m long by 300 m wide, it has been identified as an Important Bird Area by BirdLife International because it supports a breeding colony of bronze shags.

See also

 Desert island
 List of islands

References

Uninhabited islands of New Zealand
Seabird colonies
Important Bird Areas of New Zealand
Islands of Fiordland